Brasil Afora is the twelfth album by brazilian rock band Os Paralamas do Sucesso. The first single of the disc to be released to radio was A Lhe Esperar, released on January, 2009. The second single was Meu Sonho, released on June, 2009.

Track listing
Meu Sonho (My Dream)
Sem Mais Adeus (No More Farewell) (feat. Carlinhos Brown)
A Lhe Esperar (Waiting for You)
El Amor (El Amor Después Del Amor) (Love (Love After Love)) (Fito Páez cover)
Quanto ao Tempo (As for the Time)
Aposte em Mim (Bet on Me)
Mormaço (Damp Weather) (feat. Zé Ramalho)
Taubaté ou Santos (Taubaté or Santos)
Brasil Afora (All Over Brazil)
Tempero Zen (Zen Spice)
Tão Bela (So Beautiful)
O Palhaço (The Clown) (only available for digital download)

References

Os Paralamas do Sucesso albums
2009 albums
EMI Records albums
Albums produced by Liminha